Deborah Ann Roberts (born September 20, 1960) is an American television journalist for the ABC News division of the ABC broadcast television network.

Early life and education
Roberts was born in Perry, Georgia to Benjamin Roberts, a business owner, and Ruth Roberts, a housewife. She graduated from the Henry W. Grady College of Journalism and Mass Communication at the University of Georgia with a Bachelor of Journalism in 1982. In 1992, Roberts was awarded the University of Georgia Distinguished Alumnus Award for her rapid success as a journalist.

Career

In 1982, Roberts began her career at WTVM, a local television station in Columbus, Georgia, and then she moved on to work at WBIR, a local television station in Knoxville, Tennessee.

From 1987 to 1990, she served as bureau chief/NASA field reporter/weekend news co-anchor at WFTV, a local television station in Orlando, Florida. In 1990, she joined NBC News as a general-assignment reporter and later served as a correspondent for Dateline NBC, an NBC News newsmagazine program.

Roberts moved to ABC News in 1995 as a correspondent for 20/20, a newsmagazine program, as well as an anchor for World News Tonight Weekend, the weekend evening news program, and for Good Morning America, the morning news program. In July and September 2006, she was a guest host on The View, a talk show produced by ABC Daytime, a division of ABC.

Roberts has won an Emmy Award and a Clarion Award for her reporting.

Roberts has contributed to other of the network's platforms, including Good Morning America, Primetime, Nightline, and The Katie Couric Show.

Roberts hosts Lifetime Live on Lifetime Television, a cable and satellite television channel.

In 2016, the non-fiction book, Been There, Done That: Family Wisdom for Modern Times, written by Roberts and husband Al Roker, was published.

Personal life
Roberts resides in Manhattan with her husband Al Roker, whom she married in September 1995; they have a daughter and a son. Roberts has a stepdaughter from her husband's prior marriage.

See also
 New Yorkers in journalism

References

External links
 
 Staff writer (April 25, 2007).  "Deborah Roberts — ABC News Correspondent".  ABC News.  Accessed December 20, 2009.

1960 births
ABC News personalities
African-American journalists
African-American television personalities
African-American women journalists
American television reporters and correspondents
Living people
NBC News people
People from Manhattan
People from Perry, Georgia
Television anchors from Orlando, Florida
University of Georgia alumni
American women television journalists
21st-century African-American people
21st-century African-American women
20th-century African-American people
20th-century African-American women